This is a list of Northamptonshire's Twenty20 cricket records; that is, record team and individual performances in Twenty20 cricket for Northamptonshire County Cricket Club.

Most Twenty20 runs for Northamptonshire

Qualification - 1000 runs 

Most Twenty20 wickets for Northamptonshire

Qualification - 50 wickets 

Team totals

Batting

Record partnership for each wicket

Bowling

Wicket-keeping

References

External links
Cricket Archive

ESPN Cricinfo

Twenty20 cricket records
Twenty20 cricket records
Lists of Twenty20 cricket records and statistics
Lists of English cricket records and statistics